Weyr may refer to:

 Weyr, an entity in the fictional world of Pern
 Eduard Weyr (1852–1903), Czech mathematician who worked in algebra
 Emil Weyr (1848–1894), Austrian mathematician who worked in geometry
 Rudolf Weyr (1847–1914), Austrian sculptor

See also 
 Weyr canonical form of a matrix, in algebra
 Weir (disambiguation)
 Weyr a group of dragons